The North River is a river in the municipality of Havelock-Belmont-Methuen, Peterborough County in Central Ontario, Canada. It is part of the Great Lakes Basin, and is a right tributary of the Crowe River.

The river begins at Imp Lake in geographic Methuen Township and flows south, past the Blue Mountain Mine at Devil's Lake, to Kasshabog Lake. It continues south to Long Lake, then turns east, then resumes a southward direction, and enters geographic Belmont Township. The river passes through Round Lake, turns east, and reaches its mouth at Belmont Lake on the Crowe River, which flows via the Trent River to Lake Ontario.

Tributaries
Otter Creek (left)
Whitney Creek (left)
Beloporine Creek (right)

See also
List of Ontario rivers

References

Sources

Rivers of Peterborough County